Gzim Istrefi (born 18 December 1991, Kosovska Mitrovica) is a Swedish professional footballer of Albanian descent who plays for Stenungsunds IF as a forward.

Club career
His family transferred from Kosovo to Sweden in 1992, when he was only one year old. After spending his youth years with Carlstad United BK, Istrefi was purchased by GAIS. On 8 January 2019, Istrafi joined Stenungsunds IF.

International career
Although Istrefi has a Swedish passport and there has been interest from Sweden, his desire is to play with the Albania national football team as he declared recently in an interview. His message to the Albania fans, Tifozat Kuq e Zi, was the Albanian slogan Nje Komb, Nje Kombetare, which often appears in the stadiums, since Albania has many players from Kosovo.

References

External links
Profile at GAIS website

 

1991 births
Living people
Kosovo Albanians
Yugoslav emigrants to Sweden
Association football forwards
Swedish men's footballers
Kosovan men's footballers
Albanian men's footballers
Albania under-21 international footballers
Carlstad United BK players
GAIS players
Ljungskile SK players
Dalkurd FF players
Karlstad BK players
Norrby IF players
Superettan players